Daniel Wein (born 5 February 1994) is a German professional footballer who plays as a defender for 1860 Munich.

External links
 
 

1994 births
Living people
German footballers
Association football central defenders
Germany youth international footballers
FC Bayern Munich II players
SV Wehen Wiesbaden players
TSV 1860 Munich players
3. Liga players
Regionalliga players
Footballers from Munich